The 1986–87 Yugoslav Ice Hockey League season was the 45th season of the Yugoslav Ice Hockey League, the top level of ice hockey in Yugoslavia. Nine teams participated in the league, and Jesenice have won the championship.

Final ranking
Jesenice
Partizan
Olimpija
Red Star
Bosna
Kranjska Gora
Medveščak
Skopje
Vojvodina

External links
Season on eurohockey.com
Yugoslav Ice Hockey League seasons

1986–87
Yugo
1986–87 in Yugoslav ice hockey